Cárcel de mujeres, is a 1968 Mexican telenovela produced by Televisa and originally transmitted by Telesistema Mexicano.

Cast 
Erna Martha Bauman
Narciso Busquets
Carlos Navarro
Anabelle Gutiérrez

References

External links 

Mexican telenovelas
Televisa telenovelas
Spanish-language telenovelas
1968 telenovelas